The East Bulgarian is a Bulgarian breed of warmblood horse. It developed from the warmblood section established in about 1894, at the Kabiuk State Stud and Stallion Depot in Shumen Province in eastern Bulgaria. A stud-book was started in either 1951 or 1959.

References 

Horse breeds
Horse breeds originating in Bulgaria